The Battle of Hamdh (Arabic:معركة حمض ) involved 2,000 Ikhwan fighters and 100 Kuwaiti cavalry accompanied by 200 Kuwaiti infantrymen. The battle lasted six days and resulted in heavy but unknown casualties on both sides.

See also
 Battle of Jahra

References

History of Kuwait
1920 in Asia
Hamdh
Hamdh